The Indian longtailed sand-eel (Bascanichthys deraniyagalai) is an eel in the family Ophichthidae (worm/snake eels). It was described by Ambat Gopalan Kutty Menon in 1961. It is a marine, tropical eel which is known from the Pacific and Indian Ocean, including India and Sri Lanka. It inhabits river mouths and lagoons.

The Indian longtailed sand-eel is of no commercial interest to fisheries.

References

Ophichthidae
Taxa named by Ambat Gopalan Kutty Menon
Fish described in 1961